Kazimierz Polus (September 10, 1929 – March 15, 1985) was a Polish serial killer and pedophile who killed two young boys and an adult man.

Life 
He graduated from 7th grade of primary school without a learned profession. He married in 1950, but his wife divorced him the following year.

The first time he had to deal with justice was in 1953 - he was convicted of assault and rape for 10 years in prison, serving 7 of them. In 1961 he was convicted for lewd acts and sentenced to another 10 years, this time serving in the Kalisz Penal Institution.

After leaving prison he moved to Szczecin, where he worked at Szczecin's Cellulose and Paper Works. In May 1971, he murdered an 8-year-old-boy. The autopsy confirmed that the boy had been raped before his death.

In 1975 he moved back to Poznań, where he worked at the Voivodeship Transport Company, later at the Municipal Transport Company. He committed another crime in December 1975 - he murdered a 17-year-old boy, after he sexually assaulted him. In December 1982 in the village of Plewiska, he murdered a 21-year-old man.

On January 5, 1983, he was arrested. The accusation was sent to the Poznań Provincial Court in January 1984. He was charged with three sexually-motivated murders and appropriation of money belonging to one of the victims. On April 13, 1984, he was sentenced to death. He tried to appeal the verdict, but on September 18, 1984, the Supreme Court in Warsaw dismissed it. The State Council did not grant him clemency, and on February 28, 1985 the court issued a decision for the execution date. The execution was carried out at the Poznań Remand Prison on March 15, 1985.

See also 
 List of serial killers by country

References

Bibliography 
  - Note: In the article, Kazimierz Polus is described as Włodzimierz Nowakowski
   - Note: In the article, Kazimierz Polus is described as Włodzimierz Nowakowski

1929 births
1971 crimes in Poland
1971 murders in Europe
1975 crimes in Poland
1975 murders in Europe
1985 deaths
1970s murders in Poland
Executed Polish serial killers
Male serial killers
People executed by the Polish People's Republic
People executed by Poland by hanging
Polish murderers of children
Polish people convicted of child sexual abuse
Polish people convicted of rape
Violence against men in Europe